In chemistry a phosphine imide (sometimes abbreviated to phosphinimide) also known as a iminophosphorane is a functional group with the formula R3P=NR. While structurally related to phosphine oxide its chemistry has more in common with phosphonium ylides.

Anions of this group, with the structure R3P=N−, are called phosphinoimidates and are used as ligands to form phosphinimide complexes which are highly active catalysts in some olefin polymerization reactions.

Synthesis
Phosphine imides can be isolated as intermediates in the Staudinger reaction and have also been prepared by the action of hydroxylamine-O-sulfonic acid on phosphines, proceeding via a p-aminophosphonium salt.

Reactions and applications
The functional group will readily hydrolyse to give a phosphine oxide and an amine

R3P=NR'  +  H2O   →   R3P=O  +  R'NH2

Phosphinimide ligands of the general formula NPR3− form transition metal phosphinimide complexeses.  Some of these complexes are potential catalysts for the synthesis of polyethylene.

See also
 Aminophosphine 
 Phosphazene

References

Functional groups